Metin2 is a Massively Multiplayer Online Role-Playing Game (MMORPG) originally developed by Ymir Entertainment (now owned by Webzen Games) and originally released in Korea in 2004. It has since been published in many European countries and in the United States by Gameforge 4D GmbH. Other versions exist in Asian languages.

Gameplay 
Experience points are earned every time the player kills enemies or completes a mission from an NPC. The game's combat is based on a Hack and slash system. Players can also gather groups of creatures and land basic attacks and skills on each one of them simultaneously while they are all attacking the character at the same time. The game has several different player character classes, all classes have 2 different sets of skills they can use, the skills can also be upgraded. There are many different maps, monsters, semi-humans, metin stones, armors, weapons, and accessories. Some Metins even have pets and different type of mounts.

The currency in the game is called Yang, used to purchase items from the different NPC's. Players can use this to trade with other players or to their own shop. Players can also make their own guild of fighters and guilds can have wars between each other.

Player Ranks and Rank Points 
The ranking system has a role of visually displaying the nature of a player. A player can have a positive (colored in blue) or negative (colored in red) rank. The rank provides a player with some bonuses(for positive ranks) or penalties(for negative ranks).

The categories are split into nine different sections that run on a scale from -20,000 to 20,000 points.

Positive Ranks 
A positive rank is acquired by killing monsters with a +-9 level difference than the player. The rank points also automatically increase if a player spends time outside a Safe Zone.

The positive ranks range from Friendly to Chivalric. Having a positive rank increases the possibility of obtaining items from monsters or metin stones. The higher the player's rank, the higher the increase of item drop. Positive rank can also increase the success chance when a player improves a skill through a Skill Book or Soul Stone.

Negative Ranks 
A negative rank is acquired by a player if he kills other players from his empire, or is in a group where someone kill players from their same empire. Another mode where a player's rank can become negative is by levelling up his skills using the Soul Stone(from G1 to P, the highsest official level), here the rank points are deducted increasingly based on the level of the skill.

The negative ranks begin from Aggresive and end with Cruel. When a player has a negative rank, the main penalty is that he now can be attacked by other players from the same kingdom and when killed, has a chance to drop items.

Monetisation and Pay2Win Nature 
Players can also use real life currencies to buy Dragon Coins, with which players can acquire special items, bonuses, or acquire items that normally would have taken a lot of time to obtain. Those items will generally give the player a competitive advantage, either by making him deal more damage, or by him selling those items for in-game currency.

References

External links
 Official Gameforge US website
 Wiki

2004 video games
Active massively multiplayer online games
Massively multiplayer online role-playing games
Video games developed in South Korea
Windows games
Windows-only games
Webzen games
Gameforge games